Robert Winston (born 1940) is a British doctor and scientist.

Robert Winston may also refer to:

Robert Winston (coach) (1847–?), American football coach
Robert Winston (jockey) (born 1979), Irish jockey
Bob Winston (football player) (1891–1970), American college football player and politician
Bob Winston (jeweler) (1915–2003), American jeweler, sculptor, and educator